The Millis Branch was a branch of what is now the MBTA Commuter Rail system. Due to lack of subsidies and poor ridership, the line was cut back to  station in April 1966, and all service ended on April 21, 1967.

History
Initial plans to extend the line to New York City as an air-line railroad never came to pass, but a small portion of this route was built as the Woonsocket and Pascoag Railroad, opening from Woonsocket to Pascoag, Rhode Island in 1891; the latter line became functionally an extension of the Charles River Branch, with through trains from Pascoag to and from Boston, although not on schedules suitable for commuting. Ownership of the line passed through the Boston, Hartford and Erie Railroad, New York and New England Railroad, and, finally, to the New York, New Haven and Hartford Railroad (commonly referred to as just the "New Haven Railroad"), which consolidated essentially the entire southern and southeastern Massachusetts rail network under its umbrella. After the Needham cutoff opened on November 4, 1906, service from Woonsocket and intermediate stops ran over the cutoff rather than via the Highland branch.

With the Midland Line (now the Franklin Line) as the primary Woonsocket route for the New Haven Railroad, the Charles River Branch served as a minor branch line. Service beyond Bellingham Junction was discontinued entirely in 1930, and the portion of the line between Woonsocket and the state line was completely abandoned in 1934. All service beyond Needham Junction was discontinued on July 13, 1938. In September 1941, all remaining Caryville service was cut back to West Medway, which would remain the terminus of the branch for the next 25 years. After 1955, service on the branch was reduced to one single-car round trip to West Medway, which was combined with a longer Needham Heights train at Needham Junction.

By the time the Massachusetts Bay Transportation Authority (MBTA) was founded in August 1964 to subsidize suburban commuter rail service, the West Medway Branch was moribund.  Subsidies to the New Haven Railroad for the Needham, West Medway, Dedham, and Franklin lines began on April 24, 1966; out-of-district Medway declined to provide additional funding, and the line was cut back to Millis as the Millis Branch.  The sole remaining round trips to Millis and Dedham were cut on April 21, 1967, due to extremely poor ridership.

The former stations at Dover (now a Dunkin Donuts) and Millis (now town offices) are still extant; the other six stations west of Needham Junction have been demolished.

A 7-mile section of the branch from Needham Junction to Ice House Road in Medfield is planned to be converted into a compacted stone dust multi-use path through the Bay Colony Rail Trail project. The Needham section, stretching 1.7 miles from High Rock St to the Charles River, opened on May 1st, 2016. In July 2020, the state awarded $100,000 for construction of the Medfield Rail Trail, running 1.3 miles from Medfield Junction to the Dover line. This section opened on October 1st, 2022. The Dover section, which would connect the Medfield and Needham sections to create a continuous trail, remains in planning as of the end of 2022. 

The line sees occasional freight use from Medfield Junction into Millis, operated by the Bay Colony Railroad.

Station and junction listing

References

MBTA Commuter Rail
1861 establishments in Massachusetts
Millis, Massachusetts